The ARVW (Aerodynamic Research Volkswagen) concept car was built by Volkswagen in the end of the 1970s, initially for aerodynamic research to investigate the influence of a vehicle's shape on its fuel consumption at high speeds. A tuned, six-cylinder turbodiesel engine and a conventional gearbox were used, while the body was made from aluminium and composite materials.

References

ARVW